Gibbovalva urbana is a moth of the family Gracillariidae. It is known from China (Guangdong, Hainan and Fujian), India (Meghalaya) and Japan (the Ryukyu Islands, Honshū and Tusima).

The wingspan is 6–9 mm.

The larvae feed on Magnolia species (including Magnolia denudata, Magnolia sieboldii and Magnolia × soulangeana), Michelia alba, Michelia champaca, Michelia compressa and Michelia figo. They mine the leaves of their host plant.

References

Acrocercopinae
Moths of Asia
Moths of Japan
Moths described in 1908